For the American football player, see Otis Floyd.

Otis L. Floyd (1928 – May 19, 1993) was an African-American university administrator. He served as the president of Tennessee State University, a historically black university in Nashville, Tennessee, from 1986 to 1990, and as the chancellor of the Tennessee Board of Regents from 1990 to 1993.

Early life
Otis L. Floyd was born in 1928 in Bethel Springs, Tennessee. He graduated from Tennessee State University.

Career
Floyd was a vice president at Middle Tennessee State University. From 1986 to 1990, he was the president of his alma mater, Tennessee State University, a historically black university in Nashville, Tennessee. During his tenure, TSU began a "$112 million construction Master Plan project."

Floyd was chancellor of the Tennessee Board of Regents from 1990 to 1993. He was the first African-American to serve in this capacity.

Personal life and death
With his wife Mildred, had two sons and two daughters.

Floyd died of a heart attack in 1993. His funeral was held at the Temple Baptist Church in Nashville.

References

1928 births
1993 deaths
People from McNairy County, Tennessee
Tennessee State University alumni
Tennessee State University presidents
African-American academics
20th-century African-American people
20th-century American academics